Atya scabra is a species of freshwater shrimp in the family Atyidae. It lives on rocky bottoms in rivers connected to the Atlantic Ocean. The species is widespread from Mexico to Brazil, Jamaica, Hispaniola, and Puerto Rico. In Africa, it occurs from Liberia to Angola, the Cape Verde Islands and the islands of the Gulf of Guinea.

The species is commonly used as bait in commercial fishing, mostly in the northern regions of Brazil. To maintain stable populations, a no-take period from May to August and a minimum take length of 70 mm have been proposed.

References 

Atyidae
Freshwater crustaceans of Africa
Freshwater crustaceans of North America
Freshwater crustaceans of South America
Arthropods of the Dominican Republic
Crustaceans described in 1816
Taxa named by William Elford Leach